Ruzicka is a Canadian music variety television series which aired on CBC Television in 1972.

Premise
This Edmonton-produced series featured dentist and musician Bob Ruzicka (later of Homemade Jam). Guests seen during the series run included Leon Bibb, John Allan Cameron, The Good Brothers, Dan Hill, Ann Mortifee, Colleen Peterson, Stan Rogers, Brent Titcomb, Sylvia Tyson, and Valdy.

Scheduling
This half-hour series was broadcast Wednesdays at 8:30 p.m. (Eastern time) from 12 January to 27 April 1972.

References

External links

 
 

CBC Television original programming
1972 Canadian television series debuts
1972 Canadian television series endings
Mass media in Edmonton
1970s Canadian music television series